Role theory is a concept in sociology and in social psychology that considers most of everyday activity to be the acting-out of socially defined categories (e.g., mother, manager, teacher). Each role is a set of rights, duties, expectations, norms, and behaviors that a person has to face and fulfill. The model is based on the observation that people behave in a predictable way, and that an individual's behavior is context specific, based on social position and other factors. The theatre is a metaphor often used to describe role theory.

Although the word role (or roll) has existed in European languages for centuries, as a sociological concept, the term has only been around since the 1920s and 1930s. It became more prominent in sociological discourse through the theoretical works of George Herbert Mead, Jacob L. Moreno, Talcott Parsons, Ralph Linton, and Georg Simmel. Two of Mead's concepts—the mind and the self—are the precursors to role theory.

The theory posits the following propositions about social behavior:
 The division of labor in society takes the form of the interaction among heterogeneous specialized positions that we call roles;
 Social roles included "appropriate" and "permitted" forms of behavior, guided by social norms, which are commonly known and hence determine expectations;
 Roles are occupied by individuals, or "actors";
 When individuals approve of a social role (i.e., they consider the role "legitimate" and "constructive"), they will incur costs to conform to role norms, and will also incur costs to punish those who violate role norms;
 Changed conditions can render a social role outdated or illegitimate, in which case social pressures are likely to lead to role change;
 The anticipation of rewards and punishments, as well as the satisfaction of behaving in a prosocial way, account for why agents conform to role requirements.

In terms of differences among role theory, on one side there is a more functional perspective, which can be contrasted with the more micro-level approach of the symbolic interactionist tradition. This type of role theory dictates how closely related individuals' actions are to society, as well as how empirically testable a particular role theory perspective may be.

Depending on the general perspective of the theoretical tradition, there are many types of role theory, however, it may be divided into two major types, in particular: structural functionalism role theory and dramaturgical role theory. Structural functionalism role theory is essentially defined as everyone having a place in the social structure and every place had a corresponding role, which has an equal set of expectations and behaviors. Life is more structured, and there is a specific place for everything. In contrast, dramaturgical role theory defines life as a never-ending play, in which we are all actors. The essence of this role theory is to role-play in an acceptable manner in society.

A key insight of this theory is that role conflict occurs when a person is expected to simultaneously act out multiple roles that carry contradictory expectations.

Role 

Substantial debate exists in the field over the meaning of the role in role theory. A role can be defined as a social position, behavior associated with a social position, or a typical behavior. Some theorists have put forward the idea that roles are essentially expectations about how an individual ought to behave in a given situation, whereas others consider it means how individuals actually behave in a given social position. Some have suggested that a role is a characteristic behavior or expected behavior, a part to be played, or a script for social conduct.

In sociology, there are different categories of social roles: 
 cultural roles: roles given by culture (e.g. priest)
 social differentiation: e.g. teacher, taxi driver
 situation-specific roles: e.g. eye witness
 bio-sociological roles:  e.g. as human in a natural system
 gender roles: as a man, woman, mother, father, etc.

Role theory models behavior as patterns of behaviors to which one can conform, with this conformity being based on the expectations of others.

It has been argued that a role must in some sense being defined in relation to others. The manner and degree is debated by sociologists. Turner used the concept of an "other-role", arguing the process of defining a role is negotiating one's role with other-roles.

The construction of roles 

Turner argued that the process of describing a role also modifies the role which would otherwise be implicit, referring to this process as role-making arguing that very formal roles such as those in the military are not representative of roles because the role-making process is suppressed. Sociologist Howard S. Becker similarly claims that the label given and the definition used in a social context can change actions and behaviors.

Situation-specific roles develop ad hoc in a given social situation. However it can be argued that the expectations and norms that define this ad hoc role are defined by the social role.

The relationship between roles and norms 

Some theorists view behavior as being enforced by social norms. Turner rather argues that there is a norm of consistency that failing to conform to a role breaks a norm because it violates consistency.

Cultural roles 

Cultural roles are seen as a matter of course, and are mostly stable. In cultural changes new roles can develop and old roles can disappear – these cultural changes are affected by political and social conflicts. For example, the feminist movement initiated a change in male and female roles in Western societies. The roles, or the exact duties of men more specifically are being questioned. With more women going further in school than men comes more financial and occupational benefits.

Social differentiation 

Social differentiation received a lot of attention due to the development of different job roles. Robert K. Merton distinguished between intrapersonal and interpersonal role conflicts. For example, a foreman has to develop his own social role facing the expectations of his team members and his supervisor – this is an interpersonal role conflict. He also has to arrange his different social roles as father, husband, club member – this is an intrapersonal role conflict.

Ralph Dahrendorf distinguished between must-expectations, with sanctions; shall-expectations, with sanctions and rewards and can-expectations, with rewards. The foreman has to avoid corruption; he should satisfy his reference groups (e.g. team members and supervisors); and he can be sympathetic. He argues another component of role theory is that people accept their own roles in the society and it is not the society that imposes them.

Role behavior 
In their life people have to face different social roles, sometimes they have to face different roles at the same time in different social situations. There is an evolution of social roles: some disappear and some new develop. Role behavior is influenced by:
 The norms that determine a social situation.
 Internal and external expectations are connected to a social role.
 Social sanctions (punishment and reward) are used to influence role behavior.

These three aspects are used to evaluate one's own behavior as well as the behavior of other people. Heinrich Popitz defines social roles as norms of behavior that a special social group has to follow. Norms of behavior are a set of behaviors that have become typical among group members; in case of deviance, negative sanctions follow.

In public relations 
Role theory is a perspective that considers everyday activity to be acting out socially defined categories. Split into two narrower definitions: status is one's position within a social system or group; and role is one's pattern of behavior associated with a status.

Organizational role is defined as "recurring actions of an individual, appropriately interrelated with the repetitive activities of others so as to yield a predictable outcome." (Katz & Kahn, 1978). Within an organization there are three main topologies:

 Two-role typology:
 Manager
 Technician
 Four-role typology:
 Expert prescriber
 Communication facilitator
 Problem-Solving Process Facilitator
 Communication technician
 Five-role typology:
 Monitor and evaluator
 Key policy and strategic advisor
 Troubleshooter/problem solver
 Issues management expert
 Communication technician

Role conflict, strain, or making 
Despite variations in the terms used, the central component of all of the formulations is incompatibility.

Role conflict is a conflict among the roles corresponding to two or more statuses, for example, teenagers who have to deal with pregnancy (statuses: teenager, mother). Role conflict is said to exist when there are important differences among the ratings given for various expectations. By comparing the extent of agreement or disagreement among the ranks, a measure of role conflict was obtained.

Role strain or "role pressure" may arise when there is a conflict in the demands of roles, when an individual does not agree with the assessment of others concerning his or her performance in his or her role, or from accepting roles that are beyond an individual's capacity.

Role making is defined by Graen as leader–member exchange.

At the same time, a person may have limited power to negotiate away from accepting roles that cause strain, because he or she is constrained by societal norms, or has limited social status from which to bargain.

Criticism and limitations

Role theorists have noted that a weakness of role theory is in describing and explaining deviant behavior.

Role theory has been criticized for reinforcing commonly held prejudices about how people should behave; have ways they should portray themselves as well as how others should behave, view the individual as responsibility for fulfilling the expectations of a role rather than others responsible for creating a role that they can perform, and people have argued that role theory is insufficiently explains power relations, as in some situations an individual does not consensually fulfill a role but is forced into behaviors by power.
It is also argued that that role theory does not explain individual agency in negotiating their role and that role theory artificially merges roles when in practice an individual might combine roles together.

Others have argued that the concept of role takes on such a broad definition as to be meaningless.

See also 
 Behaviorism
 Conformity
Deviance (sociology)
 Dramaturgical perspective
 Game studies
 Generalized other
 Hedonism
Role engulfment
Role model
Role suction
 Transactional analysis

Notes

References

Bibliography 

Robert K. Merton, Social Theory and Social Structure, 1949
Ralf Dahrendorf, Homo sociologicus, 1958 (in German, many editions)
Rose Laub Coser, "The Complexity of Roles as a Seedbed of Individual Autonomy", in: The Idea of Social Structure: Papers in Honor of Robert K. Merton, 1975
Ralph Linton, The Study of Man'', Chapter 8, "Status and Role", 1936

External links